Hmong or Mong (RPA: , Nyiakeng Puachue: , Pahawh:) is a dialect continuum of the West Hmongic branch of the Hmongic languages spoken by the Hmong people of Sichuan, Yunnan, Guizhou, Guangxi, Hainan, northern Vietnam, Thailand, and Laos. There are some 2.7 million speakers of varieties that are largely mutually intelligible, including over 280,000 Hmong Americans as of 2013. Over half of all Hmong speakers speak the various dialects in China, where the Dananshan dialect forms the basis of the standard language. However, Hmong Daw and Mong Leng are widely known only in Laos and the United States; Dananshan is more widely known in the native region of Hmong.

Varieties
The variety spoken from Sichuan in China to Thailand and Laos is referred to in China as the "First Local Variety" of the cluster. Mong Leng and Hmong Daw are just those varieties of the cluster that migrated to Laos. The names Mong Leng, Hmong Dleu/Der, and Hmong Daw are also used in China for various dialects of the cluster.

Ethnologue once distinguished only the Laotian varieties (Hmong Daw, Mong Leng), Sinicized Miao (Hmong Shua), and the Vietnamese varieties (Hmong Dô, Hmong Don). The Vietnamese varieties are very poorly known; population estimates are not even available. In 2007, Horned Miao, Small Flowery Miao, and the Chuanqiandian cluster of China were split off from Mong Leng [blu]. 

These varieties are as follows, along with some alternative names.
 Hmong/Mong/Chuanqiandian Miao macrolanguage (China, Laos, also spoken by minorities in Thailand and the United States), including:
 Hmong Shua ('Sinicized Miao'),
 Small Flowery Miao,
 and the rest of the Chuanqiandian Miao cluster located in China.
 Hmong languages of Vietnam, not considered part of the China/Laos macrolanguage and possibly forming their own distinct macrolanguage — they are still not very well classified even if they are described by Ethnologue as having vigorous use (in Vietnam) but without population estimates; they have most probably been influenced by Vietnamese, as well as by French (in the former Indochina colonies) and later American English, and they may be confused with varieties spoken by minorities living today in the United States, Europe or elsewhere in Asia (where their varieties may have been assimilated locally, but separately in each area, with other Hmong varieties imported from Laos and China):
 Hmong Dô (Vietnam),
 Hmong Don (Vietnam, assumed).

The Centers for Disease Control and Prevention (CDC) stated that the White and Leng dialects "are said to be mutually intelligible to a well-trained ear, with pronunciation and vocabulary differences analogous to the differences between British and American English."

Several Chinese varieties may overlap with or be more distinct than the varieties listed above:
 Dananshan Miao (called  in Northern Hmong), the basis of the Chinese standard of the Chuanqiandian cluster
 Black Miao (subgroups: , /; Chinese:)
 Northern Hmong (subgroups: , /)
 Western Sichuan Miao (Chinese:)

In the 2007 request to establish an ISO code for the Chuanqiandian cluster, corresponding to the "first local dialect" of the Chuanqiandian cluster in Chinese, the proposer made the following statement on mutual intelligibility:

Varieties in Laos
According to the CDC, "although there is no official preference for one dialect over the other, White Hmong seems to be favored in many ways": the Romanized Popular Alphabet (RPA) most closely reflects that of White Hmong (Hmong Daw); most educated Hmong speak White Hmong because White Hmong people lack the ability to understand Mong Leng; and most Hmong dictionaries only include the White Hmong dialect. Furthermore, younger generations of Hmong are more likely to speak White Hmong, and speakers of Mong Leng are more likely to understand White Hmong than speakers of White Hmong are.

Varieties in the United States
Most Hmong in the United States speak White Hmong (Hmoob Dawb) and Mong Leng (Moob Leeg), with around 60% speaking White Hmong and 40% Mong Leng. The CDC states that "though some Hmong report difficulty understanding speakers of a dialect not their own, for the most part, Mong Leng seem to do better when understanding both dialects."

Phonology
The three dialects described here are Hmong Daw (also called White Miao or Hmong Der), Mong Leeg (also called Blue/Green Miao or Mong Leng), and Dananshan (Standard Chinese Miao). Hmong Daw and Mong Leeg are the two major dialects spoken by Hmong Americans. Although mutually intelligible, the dialects differ in both lexicon and certain aspects of phonology. For instance, Mong Leeg lacks the voiceless/aspirated  of Hmong Daw (as exemplified by their names) and has a third nasalized vowel, ; Dananshan has a couple of extra diphthongs in native words, numerous Chinese loans, and an eighth tone.

Vowels
The vowel systems of Hmong Daw and Mong Leeg are as shown in the following charts. (Phonemes particular to Hmong Daw and Mong Leeg are color-coded and indicated by a dagger or double dagger respectively.)

 1st Row: IPA, Hmong RPA
 2nd Row: Nyiakeng Puachue
 3rd Row: Pahawh

The Dananshan standard of China is similar. Phonemic differences from Hmong Daw and Mong Leeg are color-coded and marked as absent or added.

Dananshan  occurs only after non-palatal affricates, and is written , much like Mandarin Chinese.  is pronounced  after palatal consonants.

Consonants
Hmong makes a number of phonemic contrasts unfamiliar to English speakers. All non-glottal stops and affricates distinguish aspirated and unaspirated forms, and most also distinguish prenasalization independently of this. The consonant inventory of Hmong is shown in the chart below. (Consonants particular to Hmong Daw and Mong Leeg are color-coded and indicated by a dagger or double dagger respectively.)

1st Row: IPA, Hmong RPA
2nd Row: Nyiakeng Puachue
3rd Row: Pahawh

The Dananshan standard of China is similar. (Phonemic differences from Hmong Daw and Mong Leeg are color-coded and marked as absent or added. Aspirates, voiceless fricatives, voiceless nasals, and glottal stop only occur with yin tones (1, 3, 5, 7). Standard orthography is added in angled brackets. The glottal stop is not written; it is not distinct from a zero initial.

 The status of the consonants described here as single phonemes with lateral release is controversial. Those in favor of a unit-phoneme analysis generally argue for this based on distributional evidence (i.e., if clusters, these would be the only clusters in the language, although see below) and dialect evidence (the laterally released dentals in Mong Leeg, e.g. , correspond to the voiced dentals of White Hmong), whereas those in favor of a cluster analysis tend to argue on the basis of general phonetic principles (other examples of labial phonemes with lateral release appear extremely rare or nonexistent).

However, this cluster analysis is not as common as the above one involving .

 Only used in Hmong RPA and not in Pahawh Hmong, since Hmong RPA uses Latin script and Pahawh Hmong does not. For example, in Hmong RPA, to write , the order Consonant + Vowel + Tone (CVT) must be followed, so it is k + ee + b = , but in Pahawh Hmong, it is just  "" (2nd-Stage Version).

Syllable structure
Hmong syllables have simple structure: all syllables have an onset consonant (except in a few particles); nuclei may consist of a monophthong or diphthong; and the only coda consonants that occur are nasals. In Hmong Daw and Mong Leeg, nasal codas have become nasalized vowels, though they may be accompanied by weakly articulated . Similarly, a short  may accompany the low-falling creaky tone.

Dananshan has a syllabic  (written ) in Chinese loans, such as  'two' and  'child'.

Tones
Hmong is a tonal language and makes use of seven (Hmong Daw and Mong Leeg) or eight (Dananshan) distinct tones.

The Dananshan tones are transcribed as pure tone. However, given how similar several of them are, it is likely that there are also phonational differences as in Hmong Daw and Mong Leeg. Tones 4 and 6, for example, are said to make tenuis plosives breathy voiced, suggesting they may be breathy/murmured like the Hmong g-tone. Tones 7 and 8 are used in early Chinese loans with entering tone, suggesting they may once have marked checked syllables.

Because voiceless consonants apart from tenuis plosives are restricted to appearing before certain tones (1, 3, 5, 7), those are placed first in the table:

So much information is conveyed by the tones that it is possible to speak intelligibly using musical tunes only; there is a tradition of young lovers communicating covertly this way by playing on a jaw harp (though this method may only convey vowel sounds).

Orthography

Robert Cooper, an anthropologist, collected a Hmong folktale saying that the Hmong used to have a written language, and important information was written down in a treasured book. The folktale explains that cows and rats ate the book, so, in the words of Anne Fadiman, author of The Spirit Catches You and You Fall Down, "no text was equal to the task of representing a culture as rich as that of the Hmong." Therefore, the folktale states that the Hmong language was exclusively oral from that point onwards.

Natalie Jill Smith, author of "Ethnicity, Reciprocity, Reputation and Punishment: An Ethnoexperimental Study of Cooperation among the Chaldeans and Hmong of Detroit (Michigan)", wrote that the Qing Dynasty had caused a previous Hmong writing system to die out when it stated that the death penalty would be imposed on those who wrote it down.

Since the end of the 19th century, linguists created over two dozen Hmong writing systems, including systems using Chinese characters, the Lao alphabet, the Russian alphabet, the Thai alphabet, and the Vietnamese alphabet. In addition, in 1959 Shong Lue Yang, a Hmong spiritual leader from Laos, created an 81 symbol writing system called Pahawh. Yang was not previously literate in any language. Chao Fa, an anti-Laotian government Hmong group, uses this writing system.

In the 1980s, Nyiakeng Puachue Hmong script was created by a Hmong Minister, Reverend Chervang Kong Vang, to be able to capture Hmong vocabulary clearly and also to remedy redundancies in the language as well as address semantic confusions that was lacking in other scripts. Nyiakeng Puachue Hmong script was mainly used by United Christians Liberty Evangelical Church, a church also founded by Vang, although the script have been found to be in use in Laos, Thailand, Vietnam, France, and Australia. The script bears strong resemblance to the Lao alphabet in structure and form and characters inspired from the Hebrew alphabets, although the characters themselves are different.

Other experiments by Hmong and non-Hmong orthographers have been undertaken using invented letters.

The Romanized Popular Alphabet (RPA), the most widely used script for Hmong Daw and Mong Leeg, was developed in Laos between 1951 and 1953 by three Western missionaries. In the United States Hmong do not use RPA for spelling of proper nouns, because they want their names to be easily pronounced by people unfamiliar with RPA. For instance Hmong in the U.S. spell Hmoob as "Hmong," and Liab Lis is spelled as Lia Lee.

The Dananshan standard in China is written in a pinyin-based alphabet, with tone letters similar to those used in RPA.

Correspondence between orthographies
The following is a list of pairs of RPA and Dananshan segments having the same sound (or very similar sounds). Note however that RPA and the standard in China not only differ in orthographic rules, but are also used to write different languages. The list is ordered alphabetically by the RPA, apart from prenasalized stops and voiceless sonorants, which come after their oral and voiced homologues. There are three overriding patterns to the correspondences: RPA doubles a vowel for nasalization, whereas pinyin uses ; RPA uses  for aspiration, whereas pinyin uses the voicing distinction of the Latin script; pinyin uses  (and ) to derive the retroflex and uvular series from the dental and velar, whereas RPA uses sequences based on  vs.  for the same.

Vowels

Consonants

There is no simple correspondence between the tone letters. The historical connection between the tones is as follows. The Chinese names reflect the tones given to early Chinese loan words with those tones in Chinese.

Tones 4 and 7 merged in Hmoob Dawb, whereas tones 4 and 6 merged in Mong Leeg.

Example: lus Hmoob /̤ lṳ˧˩ m̥̥õ˦ /  / (White Hmong) / lug Moob /  / (Mong Leng) / lol Hmongb (Dananshan) / lus Hmôngz (Vietnamese) "Hmong language".

Grammar
Hmong is an analytic SVO language in which adjectives and demonstratives follow the noun. Noun phrases can contain the following elements (parentheses indicate optional elements):

(possessive) + (quantifier) + (classifier) + noun + (adjective) + (demonstrative)

The Hmong pronominal system distinguishes between three grammatical persons and three numbers – singular, dual, and plural. They are not marked for case, that is, the same word is used to translate both "I" and "me", "she" and "her", and so forth. These are the personal pronouns of Hmong Daw and Mong Leeg:

1st Row: IPA, Hmong RPA
2nd Row: Vietnamese Hmong
3rd Row: Pahawh Hmong
4th Row: Nyiakeng Puachue

Verbs
Hmong is an isolating language in which most morphemes are monosyllables. As a result, verbs are not overtly inflected. Tense, aspect, mood, person, number, gender, and case are indicated lexically.

Serial verb construction
Hmong verbs can be serialized, with two or more verbs combined in one clause. It is common for as many as five verbs to be strung together, sharing the same subject.

Here is an example from White Hmong:

Tense
Because the verb form in Hmong does not change to indicate tense, the simplest way to indicate the time of an event is to use temporal adverb phrases like "last year," "today," or "next week."

Here is an example from White Hmong:

Aspect
Aspectual differences are indicated by a number of verbal modifiers. Here are the most common ones:

Progressive: (Mong Leeg) taab tom + verb, (White Hmong) tab tom + verb = situation in progress

Taab/tab tom + verb can also be used to indicate a situation that is about to start. That is clearest when taab/tab tom occurs in conjunction with the irrealis marker yuav. Note that the taab tom construction is not used if it is clear from the context that a situation is ongoing or about to begin.

Perfective: sentence/clause + lawm = completed situation

Lawm at the end of a sentence can also indicate that an action is underway:

Another common way to indicate the accomplishment of an action or attainment is by using tau, which, as a main verb, means 'to get/obtain.' It takes on different connotations when it is combined with other verbs. When it occurs before the main verb (i.e. tau + verb), it conveys the attainment or fulfillment of a situation. Whether the situation took place in the past, the present, or the future is indicated at the discourse level rather than the sentence level. If the event took place in the past, tau + verb translates to the past tense in English.

Tau is optional if an explicit past time marker is present (e.g. nag hmo, last night). Tau can also mark the fulfillment of a situation in the future:

When tau follows the main verb (i.e. verb + tau), it indicates the accomplishment of the purpose of an action.

Tau is also common in serial verb constructions that are made up of a verb, followed by an accomplishment: (White Hmong) nrhiav tau, to look for; caum tau, to chase; yug tau, to give birth.

Mood
Future: yuav + verb:

Yuav + verb may also be seen as indicative of the irrealis mood, for situations that are unfulfilled or unrealized. That includes hypothetical or non-occurring situations with past, present, or future time references:

Phrases

Colors 
Many Hmong, and non-Hmong people who are learning the Hmong language, tends to used the word "Xim" (Thai/Lao word) to indicate a specific color. While the true Hmong word for color is "Kob". For example, "Kuv nyiam kob ntsuab;" meaning "I like the color green / I like the green color".

List of colors:

Numbers 

Days of the Week 

A sentence like, "Today is Monday" would be translated as "Hnub no yog zwj hli", and not "Hnub no yog hnub ib/Monday" in Hmong.

Months of the Year

Worldwide usage

In 2012 McDonald's introduced its first Hmong language advertising in the United States on a commercial billboard in Saint Paul, Minnesota. However it was unintelligible to Hmong speakers due to an incorrect translation. Google Translate introduced support for Hmong Daw (referred to only as Hmong) in May 2013.

Samples
From the Universal Declaration of Human Rights Article 1:

Sample text in both Hmong RPA and Pahawh Hmong:

In popular culture 
The 2008 film Gran Torino by Clint Eastwood features a large American Hmong speaking cast. The screenplay was written in English and the actors improvised the Hmong parts of the script. The decision to cast Hmong actors received a positive reception in Hmong communities. The film also gained recognition and collected awards such as the Ten Best Films of 2008 from the American Film Institute and a César Award in France for Best Foreign Film.

See also

 Hmong people
 Nyiakeng Puachue Hmong
 Pahawh Hmong
 Romanized Popular Alphabet
 Ban Phou Pheung Noi

References

Bibliography
 Cooper, Robert, Editor. The Hmong: A Guide to Traditional Lifestyles. Singapore: Times Editions. 1998. pp. 35–41.
 Finck, John. "Clan Leadership in the Hmong Community of Providence, Rhode Island." In The Hmong in the West, Editors, Bruce T. Downing and Douglas P. Olney. Minneapolis, MN: Southeast Asian Refugee Studies Project, Center for Urban and Regional Affairs, University of Minnesota, 1982, pp. 22–25.
 Thao, Paoze, Mong Education at the Crossroads, New York: University Press of America, 1999, pp. 12–13.
 Xiong Yuyou, Diana Cohen (2005). Student's Practical Miao–Chinese–English Handbook / Npout Ndeud Xof Geuf Lol Hmongb Lol Shuad Lol Yenb. Yunnan Nationalities Publishing House, 539 pp. .

Further reading
 Enwall, Joakim. Hmong Writing Systems in Vietnam: A Case Study of Vietnam's Minority Language Policy. Stockholm, Sweden: Center for Pacific Asian Studies, 1995.
 Lyman, Thomas Amis (Chulalongkorn University). "The Mong (Leeg Miao) and their Language: A Brief Compendium" (Archive). p. 63–66.
Miyake, Marc. 2011. Unicode 6.1: the Old Miao script.
Miyake, Marc. 2012. Anglo-Hmong tonology.

External links

 White Hmong Vocabulary List (from the World Loanword Database)
 White Hmong Swadesh List on Wiktionary (see Swadesh list)
 Lomation's Hmong Text Reader – free online program that can read Hmong words/text.
 Online Hmong dictionary (including audio clips)
 Mong Literacy: consonants, vowels, tones of Mong Njua and Hmong Daw
 Hmong Resources
 Hmong basic lexicon at the Global Lexicostatistical Database
 Hmong text reader
https://rpa.oneoffcoder.com/cvt.html Romanized Popular Alphabet
English-Hmong Phrasebook with Useful Wordlist (for Hmong Speakers), Center for Applied Linguistics, Washington, DC.

West Hmongic languages
Languages of China
Languages of Thailand
Languages of Laos
Languages of Vietnam
Language